Newcastle ministry may refer to:
 Pelham–Newcastle ministry, the British government under Henry Pelham and the Duke of Newcastle (1744–1754)
 First Newcastle ministry, the British government led by the Duke of Newcastle (1754–1756)
 Second Newcastle ministry, the British government led by the Duke of Newcastle (1757–1762)